Daniel Leonard Beauvais (20 October 1920 – 11 June 1998) was an Australian rules footballer who played with Carlton and Hawthorn in the Victorian Football League (VFL).

Notes

External links 

Dan Beauvais's profile at Blueseum

1920 births
1998 deaths
Carlton Football Club players
Hawthorn Football Club players
Australian rules footballers from Victoria (Australia)